Theodor Wiegand (October 30, 1864 – December 19, 1936) was one of the more famous German archaeologists. 

Wiegand was born in Bendorf, Rhenish Prussia. He studied at the universities of Munich, Berlin, and Freiburg. In 1894 he worked under Wilhelm Dörpfeld at the excavation of the Athenian Acropolis. From 1895 until 1899 he excavated the ancient Greek city of Priene, and from 1899 to 1911 he worked at Miletus. He took part in the excavations of the sanctuary of Didyma (1905–11) and of Samos (1910–11). In Pergamon he discovered, in 1927, the arsenals of the castle at the acropolis and excavated the large sanctuary of Asklepios outside the city. He also finished the excavations at Baalbek in Lebanon and published the results.

From 1899 until 1911 he worked for the museums of Berlin as a foreign director in Constantinople, the capital of the Ottoman Empire, and was the science attaché of the German Embassy there. From 1912 to 1930 he worked as the director of the Department of Antiquities in the museums of Berlin, when they built the Pergamon Museum for ancient architecture. He died in Berlin.

Selected works 

 Priene: ergebnisse er ausgrabungen und untersuchungen in den jahren 1895-1898, (with Hans Schrader), Royal Museums of Berlin, 1904 – Priene, the results of excavations and investigations in the years 1895-1898.
 Die archaische Poros-Architektur der Akropolis zu Athen, German Academy of Sciences in Berlin, 1904 – The archaic Poros architecture of the Acropolis at Athens. 
 Milet : Ergebnisse der Ausgrabungen und Untersuchungen seit dem Jahre 1899,  German Archaeological Institute. Staatliche Museen zu Berlin, 1906  – Miletus: results of excavations and investigations since 1899.
 Baalbek : Ergebnisse der Ausgrabungen und Untersuchungen in den Jahren 1898 bis 1905, (as editor) – Baalbek: results of excavations and investigations in the years 1898-1905.
 Alte Denkma¨ler aus Syrien, Pala¨stina und Westarabien; 100 Tafeln mit beschreibendem Text, vero¨ffentlicht auf Befehl von Ahmed Djemal Pascha, 1918 – Ancient monuments of Syria, Palestine and western Arabia; 100 plates with descriptive text, released on the orders of Ahmed Djemal.
 Sinai (with contributions by Friedrich Freiherr Kress von Kressenstein, et al), 1920.
 Bericht über die Ausgrabungen in Pergamon 1927, Berlin : Verlag der Akademie der Wissenschaften, in Kommission bei W. de Gruyter, 1928 – Report on the excavations at Pergamon, 1927.
 Zweiter Bericht über die Ausgrabungen in Pergamon 1928-32 – Second report on the excavations at Pergamon.
 Der Entdecker von Pergamon, Carl Humann, ein Lebensbild, Berlin, G. Grote (with Carl Schuchhardt), 1931 – The discoverer of Pergamon, Carl Humann. A life image.

Notes

Further reading

External links

 

1864 births
1936 deaths
People from Bendorf
People from the Rhine Province
Archaeologists from Rhineland-Palatinate
People of the Antikensammlung Berlin
Directors of museums in Germany
Ludwig Maximilian University of Munich alumni
Humboldt University of Berlin alumni
University of Freiburg alumni
Members of the Prussian Academy of Sciences
Recipients of the Pour le Mérite (civil class)